Dawley is a surname. Notable people with the surname include:

 Alan Dawley, American professor
 Bill Dawley, American baseball player
 Ernest J. Dawley
 Fred Dawley, American football player
 Garth Dawley
 J. Searle Dawley
 Joey Dawley, American baseball player